The women's soccer tournament at the 1998 Goodwill Games was held from July 25 to 27, 1998. It was the first time women's football was played at the Goodwill Games, and the second time the sport was played overall. No men's tournament was held in 1998. It was also the last football tournament at the Goodwill Games, as the sport was dropped in 2001. All matches were played at the Mitchel Athletic Complex in Uniondale, New York, United States.

The United States won the tournament, winning 2–0 against China PR in the gold medal match.

Schedule

Teams

Venue

Squads

The four national teams involved in the tournament were required to register a squad of players, including two goalkeepers.

Matches
All times are local, EDT (UTC−4)

Bracket

Semi-finals

Bronze medal match

Gold medal match

Statistics

Goalscorers

Tournament ranking

Medal summary

Medal table

Medalists

Notes

References

External links
 
 Results at RSSSF
 1998 Goodwill Games Soccer at Sports Illustrated

Football
1998
1998 in women's association football
August 1998 sports events in the United States
1998 in American women's soccer
International women's association football competitions hosted by the United States
1998 in sports in New York (state)
International sports competitions in New York (state)
Women's sports in New York (state)
Sports in Hempstead, New York
Soccer in the New York metropolitan area
History of the New York metropolitan area